James Heffernan may refer to:

James Heffernan (sculptor) (1788-1847) Irish sculptor
James J. Heffernan (1888–1967), U.S. Representative from New York
James Heffernan (Irish politician) (born 1979), Irish Labour Party politician
Frank Heffernan (James Francis Heffernan, 1892–1938), Canadian ice hockey defenceman and coach